Kaiji Tang (pronounced "Kay-jee"; born January 25, 1984) is a Chinese voice actor who is based in Los Angeles.

Biography 
Tang was born in Shanghai, China on January 25, 1984. He graduated from the University of California, Riverside with a degree in theatre. He comes from a theatrical background and moved to Los Angeles in 2007 to do commercial work. He starred in commercials for Garmin GPS and The Discovery Channel. After appearing in a cult-classic movie called Zombie Strippers as a zombie, he auditioned for a podcast for a dubbing studio and was eventually hired. Ever since then, he has found success in finding roles for anime and video game characters. Tang has stated that he never set out to do voice work and it all came later on in his life. Tang enjoys his profession and likes contributing to the video game industry as he compares video games to novels. Tang hosts the YouTube channel Voices of Gaming.

Career 
In anime, Tang is known as the voice of Osamu Dazai from Bungo Stray Dogs, Big G from Doraemon, Satoru Gojo from Jujutsu Kaisen, Kashin Koji from  Boruto: Naruto Next Generations, Hendrickson from The Seven Deadly Sins, Guts from Berserk, Tsumugu Kinagase from Kill La Kill, Tetsudo "Poppo" Hisakawa from Anohana: The Flower We Saw That Day, Archer from Fate/stay night: Unlimited Blade Works, Joe from Megalo Box and recently as Jin Kazama, lead character in Tekken: Bloodline. In video games, he is known for his performances as Wingul from Tales of Xillia, Fang from Fairy Fencer F, Gaius Worzel from The Legend of Heroes: Trails of Cold Steel series, Yasuhiro Hagakure and Gonta Gokuhara from the Danganronpa series, and Ichiban Kasuga in the Yakuza series.

He is also known for voicing Owain/Odin in the Fire Emblem series, as well as the titular character in Detective Pikachu and voiced Tom Cat in the 2021 film Tom & Jerry.

Personal life 
Tang revealed on Twitter in 2021 that he had no desire to work in any environment that does not recognize Taiwan as a country, and that he and his family fled his birth country of the People's Republic of China due to their shared opposition of the country's ruling communist party. He married voice actress Marcy Edwards on June 24, 2017. He has a sister named Katherine.

Filmography

Films

Video games

Live action

Webseries

Anime

References

External links 

1984 births
Living people
American agnostics
American anti-communists
American male video game actors
American male voice actors
American podcasters
Animal impersonators
Chinese anti-communists
Chinese emigrants to the United States
Chinese male voice actors
Male actors from Los Angeles
Male actors from Shanghai
Twitch (service) streamers
University of California, Riverside alumni
21st-century American male actors
21st-century Chinese male actors